The Sainte-Barbe Clays Formation is a geological formation in Belgium. It is found in localised areas of the northern margin of the Mons Basin, alongside the equivalently aged Hautrage and Baudour Clay Formations. It is Upper Barremian-Lower Aptian in age. It predominantly consists of laminated clay, with some lignite. It is well known for the "Iguanodon sinkhole" locality near Bernissart where many specimens of Iguanodon bernissartensis were described by Louis Dollo in the late 19th century.

Geologic context 
The Sainte-Barbe Clays Formation are part of the stratigraphy of the Mons Basin, a Cretaceous-Cenozoic sedimentary basin in western Belgium. The subsidence of the basin floor is caused by the dissolution of anhydrite in the Carboniferous basement. Wealden facies are the oldest units within the basin, and are only found on the northern margin of the basin, being absent from the central and southern parts of the basin. Localised areas of significant subsidence, referred to as "sinkholes" are observed. The Wealden facies are overlain by "mixed siliciclastic–carbonate formations" called Meules dating to the Albian.

Fossil content

Tetrapods

Fish 

Other fish
* Leptolepis attenuatus
 L. brevis
 Notagogus parvus
 Ophiopsis dorsalis
 O. penicillatus
 Pachythrissops vectensis
 Pholidophorus obesus
 Scheenstia mantelli
 Belonostomus sp.
 Caturus sp.
 Pholidophorus sp.
 Polypsephis sp.
 Typodus sp.

Insects 
The Tettigarctid cicada Hylaeoneura lignei is known from the formation.

Parasites 

 Ascarites gerus
 A. priscus
 Digenites proterus
 Entamoebites antiquus

Flora 

 Alethopteris elegans
 Cladophlebis dunkeri
 Conites minuta
 Laccopteris dunkeri
 Leckenbya valdensis
 Matonidium goepperti
 Onychiopsis mantelli
 Pecopteris conybeari
 P. polymorpha
 Pinites solmsi
 Polypodites mantelli
 Ruffordia goepperti
 Sagenopteris mantelli
 Sphenopteris delicatissima
 S. fittoni
 S. roemeri
 Stellatopollis hughesii
 Weichselia mantelli
 Adiantites sp.
 Equisetites sp.
 Gleichenia sp.
 Gleichenites sp.
 Hausmannia (Protorhipis)
 Lycopodites sp.
 cf. Taeniopteris sp.

Ichnofossils 
 Algites sp.

References

Bibliography

Further reading 
 P.-J. Van Beneden. 1878. Sur la découverte de reptiles fossiles gigantesques dans le charbonnage de Bernissart près de Péruwelz [On the discovery of gigantic fossil reptiles in the Bernissart coal mine near Péruwelz]. Bulletin de l'Academie Royale des Sciences, des Lettres et des Beaux-Arts de Belgique, série 2 45:578-579

Geologic formations of Belgium
Lower Cretaceous Series of Europe
Barremian Stage
Aptian Stage
Shale formations
Coal formations
Coal in Belgium
Lacustrine deposits
Ichnofossiliferous formations
Fossiliferous stratigraphic units of Europe
Paleontology in Belgium